Suhodol may refer to:
 Sukhodol (disambiguation), several places in Russia
 Suhodol, Donji Vakuf, a village in Bosnia and Herzegovina
 Suhodol, Burgas Province, a village in Burgas Province, Bulgaria
 , a village in Glavinitsa Municipality, Silistra Province, Bulgaria
 , a neighbourhood of Sofia, Bulgaria

See also 
 Suhodol Zelinski, a settlement in Croatia
 Banski Suhodol, a mountain peak in Bulgaria
 Suchodol (disambiguation), places in Poland and Czechia
 Suhi Dol (disambiguation)
 Suhindol, a town in Veliko Tarnovo Province, Bulgaria
 Suvodol, several places in Serbia and North Macedonia